Zagórzany  is a village in the administrative district of Gmina Gorlice, within Gorlice County, Lesser Poland Voivodeship, in southern Poland.

The village has a population of 2,300.

Polish interwar politician Aleksander Skrzyński was born in the village.

References

Villages in Gorlice County